Vivian Hewitt (1888–1965) was a pioneering Welsh aviator. Born in Grimsby, he moved to Bodfari, Denbighshire, Wales, his mother's family home, on the death of his father during his childhood.

On 26 April 1912, Hewitt successfully completed a flight between Holyhead and Dublin, landing in the Phoenix Park. Interviewed by the press, he expressed the view that Damer Leslie Allen, who had disappeared a few days earlier whilst attempting the same flight, had been insufficiently experienced as an aviator for a task of such difficulty.

Although widely reported to be the first person to cross the sea from Great Britain to Ireland in an aeroplane, several days earlier, on 22 April Denys Corbett Wilson had flown from Goodwick in Pembrokeshire to Enniscorthy. Nevertheless, the view was expressed at the time that Hewitt's flight was "a more difficult and dangerous feat" than Corbett Wilson's.

Hewitt was also a keen ornithologist and set up a bird sanctuary at his home of Bryn Aber at Cemlyn Bay, Anglesey, which is now managed by The North Wales Wildlife Trust. He was known as the "world’s greatest private Great Auk collector", as he built up a collection of the skins and eggs of these extinct birds. His specimens are now in museums in Cardiff, Birmingham, Los Angeles, and Cincinnati.

References

1888 births
1965 deaths
Welsh aviators
British aviators
Bodfari